Cruel but Necessary is a 2005 independent film directed by Canadian actor/film director Saul Rubinek. Actress Wendel Meldrum took a turn as a screenwriter for this project. Meldrum stars in the film as Betty Munson, a woman struggling to put her life back together after her marriage falls apart. Betty decides to secretly videotape family, friends, and others to help understand the truth of her life. Meldrum's own ex-husband Mark Humphrey and son Luke Humphrey play her onscreen ex-husband and son.

Portions of Cruel but Necessary were posted on YouTube beginning in 2007. The film was released on DVD November 11, 2008.

Cast
Wendel Meldrum as Betty Munson
Mark Humphrey as Doug Munson
Luke Humphrey as Darwin Munson
Fred Goss as Chad
James O'Connell as Teddy
Julie Payne as Pearl
Lisa Zane as Gynecologist

Awards 
Outstanding Actress in a Female Role, Wendel Meldrum - 2007 Winnipeg International Film Festival.

References

External links
 Cruel but Necessary - Trailer on YouTube.com

 Variety.com Review  by Ken Eisner (June 2005)

American independent films
2005 films
2005 drama films
2005 independent films
American drama films
2000s English-language films
2000s American films